Port Anson is a town on Sunday Cove Island in the Canadian province of Newfoundland and Labrador. The town had a population of 42 in 2021, down from 155 in the Canada 2006 Census.

Demographics 

See also
 List of cities and towns in Newfoundland and Labrador

References

Towns in Newfoundland and Labrador